A.D.F.C.F. UCR is a soccer club in Costa Rica.

On 2 June 2017 the university rector Henning Jensen announced the cease of the agreement with the club, which starting on 1 July will no longer represent the university in any form.

The club was refounded on June 28, 2019, after having finalized its league with the University of Costa Rica. It has the administrative management of manager Javier Delgado and his home games are held at the Carlos Alvarado Villalobos Stadium.

History
Founded as Universidad Nacional in 1941, they won their only league title in 1943 and were relegated to the Segunda División in 1956. They had another spell in the top tier between 1973 and 1976 and Universidad won promotion again to the Primera División after a record 30 years, after winning both the 2006 Apertura and 2007 Clausura seasons.

On 2 June 2017 Henning Jensen, rector of the University of Costa Rica, announced the cease of the agreement between the university and the club, citing that the transfer of the administrative management of the team to the Colombian company Con Talla Mundial was neither requested nor advised to the university. Jensen also stated that the club did not comply with the correction in the financial part of the club.

Stadium 

Throughout its history, the University of Costa Rica Soccer Club used various scenarios, especially because the University of Costa Rica did not have its own stadium until the construction of the Ecological Stadium, a venue located within the university sports facilities, located in the canton of Montes de Oca.  The Ecológico was the club's own headquarters since its opening in 2008, and there it starred in various matches in both the first and second divisions.  However, and especially since the club returned to the first division in 2013, the small capacity of the Ecological Stadium (1,800 fans) motivated the team to look for other venues for economic reasons.  Among the stadiums that were once the official headquarters of the University of Costa Rica Soccer Club are the Alejandro Morera Soto Stadium, the Ricardo Saprissa Stadium, the Eladio Rosabal Cordero Stadium and the Jorge Hernán "Cuty" Monge Stadium, among others.

Honours

National competitions
 Primera División
Winners (1): 1943

 Segunda División
Winners (3): 1972–73, 2006–07, 2012–13

Championship 1943
List of players and coaching staff who won the Costa Rica First Division National Soccer Championship on November 14, 1943, under the name Club de Fútbol de la Universidad de Costa Rica.

References

External links
  Official Web Site

Football clubs in Costa Rica
Football clubs in San José, Costa Rica
Association football clubs established in 1941
University of Costa Rica
1941 establishments in Costa Rica